José Acasuso was the defending champion but decided not to participate.
Rubén Ramírez Hidalgo won the title defeating Jérémy Chardy in the final 6–1, 6–4.

Seeds

Draw

Finals

Top half

Bottom half

External Links
 Main Draw
 Qualifying Draw

Tunis Open - Singles
2012 Singles